Vető is a Hungarian surname. Notable people with the surname include:

 Tamás Vető (1935-), Hungarian-born Danish conductor
 Gábor Vető (1988-), Hungarian boxer
 :hu:Vető József (1910-1977) Hungarian journalist
 Lajos Vető (1904-1989) Hungarian Lutheran bishop

Hungarian-language surnames